is a Japanese handball player for Hokkoku Bank and the Japanese national team.

She participated at the 2017 World Women's Handball Championship.

References

1995 births
Living people
Japanese female handball players
Handball players at the 2020 Summer Olympics